Kenneth R. Harding (March 28, 1914 – October 3, 2007) served as Sergeant at Arms of the United States House of Representatives from October 1, 1972 until February 29, 1980.

Personal life
Harding was born on March 28, 1914, in Medina, New York.  His parents were Victor Hunt Harding and Edith Falk Harding. He graduated from George Washington University Law School in 1937.  He married his first wife, Jane Wedderburn Harding, in 1938.  The couple were married for 68 years until her death in 2005.

Career
Harding served in the U.S. Navy for three years and the U.S. Air Force Reserves for ten years. He retired from the Reserves as a full Colonel.  He went on to become executive director of the Democratic Congressional Campaign Committee in 1954, which he held for 18 years.

Harding worked in some capacity on Capitol Hill for over thirty years and served as Sergeant at Arms of the United States House of Representatives from October 1, 1972 until February 29, 1980.  He moved to Ormond Beach, Florida, upon his retirement.

Death
Kenneth R. Harding died of pneumonia at Ormond Beach Memorial Hospital in Florida on October 3, 2007, at the age of 93.  He was survived by his second wife, Ruth Campbell Harding, four sons, Kenneth (Honolulu), Richard (Savannah), Bruce (New York), and Victor (Orlando), and thirteen grandchildren, including actor and television host, Zay Harding and physician-author, Kelli Harding.

References

External links
Washington Post: Kenneth Harding; House Sergeant-at-Arms and Hill Fixture
Daytona Beach News-Journal: Kenneth R. Harding

1914 births
2007 deaths
Sergeants at Arms of the United States House of Representatives
United States Navy personnel of World War II
Deaths from pneumonia in Florida
George Washington University Law School alumni
People from Medina, New York